Phiroze Edulji Palia  (5 September 1910 – 9 September 1981) was an early Indian cricketer. His first name is sometimes written as other orthographic variations including Phiroz. Palia represented India in his first ever Test match at Lord's in 1932. He suffered an injury while fielding. In the second innings he was hardly in a position to walk, but batted as the last man. He again toured England in 1936 and played at Lord's.

He represented United Provinces in the Ranji Trophy and the Parses in the Bombay Pentangular. His highest score was 216 made against Maharashtra in 1939–40 in a losing cause. He was an attractive left hand batsman and a useful spinner.

For a time, Palia was in the service of the Maharajkumar of Vizianagram. Later in life, he established a timber and furniture business in Bangalore. His father was a prominent figure in the business circles in Bombay in the 1920s.

References

External links

 Christopher Martin-Jenkins, The Complete Who's Who of Test Cricketers
 

Indian cricketers
India Test cricketers
Karnataka cricketers
Parsees cricketers
Tamil Nadu cricketers
East Zone cricketers
South Zone cricketers
Mumbai cricketers
Bengal cricketers
Uttar Pradesh cricketers
Parsi people from Mumbai
1981 deaths
1910 births
Cricketers from Mumbai
Roshanara Club cricketers